Lumbayanague, officially the Municipality of Lumbayanague (Maranao: Inged a Lumbayanague), is a 4th class municipality in the province of Lanao del Sur, Philippines. According to the 2020 census, it has a population of 19,091 people.

History
Lumbayanague among to the Nine Princess of Unayan (e.g. in Meranau term Sanaulan Dago-ok that means "Sana" Lumbayanague)

Geography

Barangays
Lumbayanague is politically subdivided into 22 barangays.

Climate

Demographics

Economy

References

External links
 Lumbayanague Profile at the DTI Cities and Municipalities Competitive Index
 [ Philippine Standard Geographic Code]
 Philippine Census Information
 Local Governance Performance Management System

Municipalities of Lanao del Sur
Populated places on Lake Lanao